Miro Jurić (born 10 August 1972) is a Croatian professional basketball coach and former player. He currently serves as an assistant coach for Šibenka of the Croatian League.

National team career
Jurić was a member of the cadet Yugoslavia national team that won the silver medal at the 1989 European Championship in Spain. 

He was also a member of the senior Croatia national team that won the bronze medal at the 1994 World Cup.

Coaching career

Šibenka (2010–2019; 2020–present)
Following his retirement from playing professional basketball, Jurić was appointed assistant coach for Šibenka under the coaching staff of the head coach Jeronimo Šarin, in 2010, which role he took alongside Nenad Amanović and his former team-mate Petar Maleš. 

On 11 May 2018, after the head coach Vladimir Anzulović parted ways with the club, Jurić was named his successor as the head coach at his hometown club. In his official head coaching debut, on 6 October, Jurić led the team to an 86–79 home win against Gorica. 

On 2 November 2019, following a 111–77 away loss to Cibona in the Croatian League, he was sacked by the club.

On 24 June 2020, following the appointment of Dženan Rahimić as head coach for Šibenka, Jurić was named his assistant.

References

1972 births
Living people
Croatian basketball coaches
Croatian men's basketball players
KK Split players
Basketball players from Šibenik
1994 FIBA World Championship players